Pleasant Hills is a census-designated place (CDP) in Harford County, Maryland, United States. The population was 3,379 at the 2010 census, up from 2,851 in 2000. There is no post office with the designation "Pleasant Hills"; most of the residents have either Fallston or Kingsville addresses and consider themselves as belonging to those communities .

Geography
It is bordered to the southwest by Baltimore County, with the county border following the Little Gunpowder Falls. Maryland Route 147 (Harford Road) forms the northwestern edge of the CDP. U.S. Route 1 (Bel Air Road) runs through the community, leading northeast  to Bel Air, the Harford County seat, and southwest  to Baltimore. Maryland Route 152 crosses US 1 in Pleasant Hills, leading northwest  to Fallston and southeast  to Interstate 95 near Joppatowne.

Demographics

As of the census of 2000, there were 2,851 people, 1,026 households, and 854 families residing in the CDP. The racial makeup of the CDP was 96.28% White, 1.19% African American, 0.14% Native American, 1.19% Asian, 0.25% from other races, and 0.95% from two or more races. Hispanic or Latino of any race were 1.05% of the population.

There were 1,026 households, out of which 33.6% had children under the age of 18 living with them, 74.6% were married couples living together, 5.9% had a female householder with no husband present, and 16.7% were non-families. 14.0% of all households were made up of individuals, and 7.8% had someone living alone who was 65 years of age or older. The average household size was 2.78 and the average family size was 3.07.

In the CDP, the population was spread out, with 24.3% under the age of 18, 5.3% from 18 to 24, 26.2% from 25 to 44, 27.4% from 45 to 64, and 16.8% who were 65 years of age or older. The median age was 42 years. For every 100 females, there were 98.5 males. For every 100 females age 18 and over, there were 94.9 males.

The median income for a household in the CDP was $63,351, and the median income for a family was $65,679. Males had a median income of $51,566 versus $31,857 for females. The per capita income for the CDP was $26,435. About 3.4% of families and 2.8% of the population were below the poverty line, including 2.2% of those under age 18 and 5.3% of those age 65 or over.

References

Census-designated places in Harford County, Maryland
Census-designated places in Maryland